"More" (stylized in all caps) is a song by virtual girl group K/DA. The song was released on October 28, 2020, as the second single for the group's debut extended play All Out. Soyeon and Miyeon of (G)I-dle, Madison Beer, and Jaira Burns, all of whom participated in K/DA's debut song "Pop/Stars", returned for this single. In addition to the four champions of K/DA, Lexie Liu, who was in charge of Seraphine's voice, also participated in the song. Commercially, the song debuted on the Billboard Global 200 and Billboard Global Excl. U.S., making "More" the first virtual band song to simultaneously debut on the chart.

Release and promotion
The group began to tease the song on their social media platforms before officially announcing its release to be October 28, 2020. Upon the song's release, Riot released several official K/DA merchandise, in which the collection features a wide range of apparel items from collectables with holographic and reflective materials, to the branding of K/DA's EP, All Out. The group also launched the hashtags, "#YouWantMore" and "#MoreChallenge", on various social media platforms such as TikTok and Twitter. On October 29, players were able to acquire and purchase limited-time themed icons, skins and other in-game cosmetics in League of Legends, League of Legends: Wild Rift and Legends of Runeterra. There are two available icons; the K/DA logo signed by all members of the group, and an image of the featured artist, Seraphine. The skin line which is available in League of Legends and Wild Rift is called "K/DA All Out" and is available for Ahri, Akali, Kai'Sa, Evelynn, and Seraphine.

Erika Thomas of DBLTAP described "More" a "re-upped single that definitely does not disappoint." Judah Charles Lotter of Meaww described the song "a stomp-hard pop track electrified by synth and antheming out vocals in the chorus."

Cover versions by several artists including Ukrainian artist Maruv and Polish singer and songwriter Ewelina Lisowska also have been released.

On October 29, K/DA and Seraphine appeared on the official cover of fashion magazine Dazed'''s China November issue in Louis Vuitton.

Composition
"More" is composed of the K/DA's original singers Evelynn, Ahri, and Kai'Sa, as well as Akali, who returns to the group after debuting in True Damage in 2019. Seraphine, the 152nd champion and new champion of League of Legends, participates as a featured artist, singing the bridge with a mix of Chinese and English lyrics.

Commercial performance
After one day of tracking, the song charted on South Korea's major domestic music sites such as Melon, Genie, Bugs, and Flo. The song debuted at number 2 on the US World Digital Song Sales with only one and half day of tracking. The track also charted at number 16 on the China QQ Music and peaked at number 1 on the QQ Game Music Chart.

Live performance
In September, it was reported that K/DA would perform at the opening ceremony of the 2020 League of Legends World Championship Finals. It is co-produced by Possible Productions, who produced other works such as the MTV Video Music Awards and the Super Bowl Halftime shows. The stage would incorporate Unreal Engine 5, modified by Possible Productions, and Lux Machina and would have over 40 VR and AR techs and artists. David Higdon, Head of Global Esports Communications at Riot Games said, "It's the most advanced mixed reality rendering system in the world, which will render in real-time at 32K resolution and 60 FPS. It’s pretty mind-blowing. Worlds 2020 is going to be unlike anything you've seen before."

On October 31, K/DA performed "More" at Pudong Football Stadium, Shanghai, China as the opening ceremony of the 10th anniversary of League of Legends World Championship and the finals between Damwon Gaming and Suning. Due to travel restrictions related to the COVID-19 pandemic, only Lexie Liu was able to perform live on stage with the virtual K/DA. The group performed for the crowd of 6,000 fans in attendance. "More" was choreographed by The Kinjaz, who is best known for being the runners-up eight season of MTV's America's Best Dance Crew''.

Music video

Reception
The official music video premiered on YouTube on October 28, 2020, at 00:00 pm KST. The music video recorded 5 million views in 10 hours and garnered over 10 million views in its first 24 hours. Less than a day after it went live, the video has been played more than 140,000 times on QQ Music, and ranked 7th on the Weekly MV list with comments reached more than 3,000 in an instant. The music video debuted and charted at number 5 on QQ Music Music Video and peaked number 3 on the chart issue dated November 9–15, 2020.

Development
The music video features the visual's fantastical futurescape Ahri, Akali, Evelynn and Kai'Sa spin circles on a high-octane motorcycle, hovers in zero gravity and performs pop choreography against an ever-changing backdrop of striking color. The digital quartet sings the chorus while dancing in the gilded throne room before Seraphine joins the action to deliver the track's floating bridge. Seraphine's diary was seen opened in her bedroom floor. On the page, it shows her starting point in July, when she was an independent singer and had not been revealed as a new hero of LoL. Her room was filled with various posters and merchandise such as posters that showed her close relationship with Soyeon and Miyeon as the voice actor of Akali and Ahri. There is a yellow poster of the cover image of (G)I-dle's song "Dumdi Dumdi", and the black poster above is the logo of Neverland, (G)I-dle's official fandom name. The ending scene of "More", K/DA and Seraphine performed on the skyscraper rooftop in the middle of the night. Some digital billboards display other games from Riot Games, such as the inverted animation of the Valorant logo on the left and the revised logo of LoL Esports on the right. Ducati revealed a partnership with League of Legends, designing a digital bike of Ducati Panigale V4 for Akali in the music video.

International versions

Track listing
Download and streaming
 "More" – 3:37

Credits and personnel
Credits are adapted from Melon and Tidal.

 Vocals – Soyeon and Miyeon of (G)I-dle, Madison Beer, Lexie Liu, Jaira Burns and Seraphine
 Riot Games Music Team – production, composer, songwriting, vocal production, mix engineer, mastering engineer
 Sebastien Najand – composer
 Rebecca Johnson – songwriting, additional vocals
 Lexie Liu - Chinese translation
 Lydia Paek – Korean translation
 Minji Kim – Korean translation

Charts

Release history

References

2020 singles
2020 songs
(G)I-dle songs
Madison Beer songs
K-pop songs
Macaronic songs
League of Legends World Championship